Miss Earth USA 2023 was the 19th Miss Earth USA pageant to be held on January 7, 2023, in Orlando, Florida.  Brielle Simmons of Connecticut crowned Danielle Mullins of Kentucky as her successor at the end of the event. She will go on to represent the United States at Miss Earth 2023 in Vietnam.

Results

Judges

Live telecast judges
Kataluna Enriquez – Fashion Designer and Miss Nevada USA 2021
Andreia Gibau – Miss Earth USA 2017 and Miss USA 2020 – Top 10 finalist 
Donald Wells – Veteran NFL & NBA Cheerleader Director 
Lindsey Coffey – Miss Earth 2020 from United States 
Saje Nicole – Sports Illustrated Model, entrepreneur

Interview judges
Andreia Gibau – Miss Earth USA 2017 
Lisa Forbes Cardell – Miss Earth USA 2007 
Thom Brodeur – Owner, Queen Beauty Universe
Elizabeth Safrit Bull –  Miss World 2014 – 2nd Runner-up 
Laura Clark – National Director Miss Earth USA

Contestants 
All 51 titleholders were crowned in 2022 and were officially announced via Miss Earth USA social media platforms in December 2022.

Notes

References

External links
 

2023 beauty pageants
January 2023 events in the United States
2023 in Florida
Beauty pageants in the United States